Dmitri Igorevich Rudakov (born 10 April 1997) is a Russian football player.

Club career
He made his debut in the Russian Football National League for FC Tekstilshchik Ivanovo on 10 July 2021 in a game against FC Rotor Volgograd.

References

External links
 
 Profile by Russian Football National League

1997 births
People from Orenburg
Sportspeople from Orenburg Oblast
Living people
Russian footballers
Association football forwards
FC Orenburg players
FC Nosta Novotroitsk players
FC Neftekhimik Nizhnekamsk players
FC Tekstilshchik Ivanovo players
Russian Second League players
Russian First League players